York College is a further and higher education college in York, England, established in 1999.

History 
The York Mechanics' Institute was founded in 1827 and taught art and science classes. By 1877, the institute had a library that contained over 10,000 volumes. In 1891, a technical school was founded by the City of York Council and this took over teaching from the Mechanics' Institute which was dissolved in 1892 with its library and many of the books being handed over to the council.

The college was established in its present form in 1999 by a merger of York Sixth Form College and York College of Further and Higher Education, which had been known as York College of Arts and Technology. A £60 million redevelopment of the former sixth form college site began in 2005, and the present campus opened in September 2007. During the development, concerns were raised about the impact on traffic. The site would cater for 13,000 students based across North Yorkshire and the East Riding of Yorkshire. The Learning and Skills Council contributed £21 million funding to the project, with the rest of the costs being met through the sale of the former site on Tadcaster Road. The buildings had replaced what was formerly the Ashfield Secondary Modern School, before the sixth form opened on the site in 1985. During the redevelopment all the students were based on the further and higher education site at Tadcaster Road, which was afterwards demolished to make way for housing.

A December 2013 Ofsted inspection report rated the college 'outstanding' in terms of its overall effectiveness.

In September 2015, York College opened a building dedicated to construction and skills as part of its main campus. The site was officially opened by Nick Boles on 14 March 2016.

Courses 
York College offers A-Levels, vocational courses, apprenticeships, higher education and adult learning courses. It is an associate college of the University of York. The college has approximately 8,400 students, including 4,350 who study full-time. Around 400 students study at university level.

In April 2012, York College and York St. John University formed a partnership in an attempt to 'maximise opportunities' for students and provide a clear progression route, starting from pre-degree through to postgraduate level.

In June 2017, the college was rated as 'silver' by the Teaching Excellence Framework (TEF) according to its standard of undergraduate teaching.

Notable former pupils
 Romário Vieira, professional footballer
 Ronaldo Vieira, professional footballer

See also

University of York
York St John University

References

External links
 Official site

Further education colleges in North Yorkshire
Higher education colleges in England
Education in York
Educational institutions established in 1999
1999 establishments in England